Cornelius Holland (1599 –  1671)

Born London, England; died possibly at Lausanne, Switzerland about 1671, after he was wanted for his part in the regicide of Charles I of England.

Holland is alleged to have been the chief hand in drawing up the charges against King Charles I, although he was not present when the sentence of death was pronounced, nor does his name appear on the warrant of execution. In February 1649, he was appointed to Council of State and was reappointed the next years.

Holland lived for a time at Creslow Manor House which he remodelled ca. 1646. This manor house is mentioned in Chambers Book of Days under June 23:

See also
List of regicides of Charles I

Footnotes

1599 births
1670s deaths
Regicides of Charles I